Charles Frederick Aubrey de Vere Beauclerk, 13th Duke of St Albans, OBE (16 August 1915 – 8 October 1988) was a British soldier and peer.

Early life
St Albans was the son of Aubrey Topham de Vere Beauclerk (1850–1933) and Gwendolen Loftus Hughes (1880–1958). He was a great-grandson of William Beauclerk, 8th Duke of St Albans.

Charles St Albans was educated at Hordle House School, Eton and Magdalene College, Cambridge.

Career
Commissioned in the British Army, he reached the rank of Lieutenant-Colonel of the Intelligence Corps before the age of 30, and later was deployed to the British Embassy in Vienna. He moved to London after the birth of his fourth son, and joined the Central Office of Information. He became head in turn of the Film, Radio and Book divisions. He inherited the dukedom from his cousin in 1964, after which he left the Central Office of Information. He attempted to rebuild the family fortunes through a series of misguided ventures, which led to massive personal losses for himself, and accusation of mishandling of share dealing in relation to the company Grendon Securities.

As Hereditary Grand Falconer of England, the Duke had an ancient entitlement to an annual side of venison from deer culled in the Royal Parks, which he gave to charity.

In the 1970s St Albans moved to Vence in France, before becoming a resident of Monaco.

Family
He married Nathalie Chatham Walker (1915 - 1985) on 21 March 1938 and they divorced in 1947 they had one child and son: 
Murray Beauclerk, 14th Duke of St Albans (born 19 January 1939)

He married Suzanne Marie Adèle Fesq on 19 March 1947; they had four children:

 Lord Peter Charles de Vere Beauclerk
 Lord James Charles Fesq de Vere Beauclerk
 Lord John William Aubrey de Vere Beauclerk
 Lady Caroline Anne de Vere Beauclerk
 stillborn daughter

Sources
 Burke's Peerage, Baronetage & Knightage, 107th Edition, edited by Charles Mosley, Wilmington, Delaware, 2003, vol III, pp. 3459-3466,

References

External links

 The House of Nell Gwyn: Fortunes of the Beauclerk Family, Donald Adamson (William Kimber, Ldn 1974)

1915 births
1988 deaths
Alumni of Magdalene College, Cambridge
C
British Army personnel of World War II
20th-century British businesspeople
British expatriates in France
British expatriates in Monaco
113
Officers of the Order of the British Empire
People educated at Eton College
People educated at Walhampton School and Hordle House School